Cécile Ngambi (born 15 November 1960) is a retired Cameroonian heptathlete. She was the first woman to represent Cameroon at the Olympics.

She competed in pentathlon at the 1980 Summer Olympics and 100 metres at the 1984 Summer Olympics. She won the silver medal in 100 metres hurdles at the 1985 African Championships.

References

External links
 

1960 births
Living people
Cameroonian heptathletes
Athletes (track and field) at the 1980 Summer Olympics
Athletes (track and field) at the 1984 Summer Olympics
Olympic athletes of Cameroon
Cameroonian female hurdlers
Cameroonian female sprinters
Pentathletes
20th-century Cameroonian women
21st-century Cameroonian women